The speckled worm-skink (Praeteropus gowi) is a species of skink found in Queensland in Australia.

References

Praeteropus
Reptiles described in 1985
Taxa named by Allen Eddy Greer
Taxa named by Harold Cogger